Viktor Bergström (born 14 November 1986 in Kolmården) is a former motorcycle speedway rider from Sweden.

Career
He raced in Britain in the Premier League for Leicester Lions and Scunthorpe Scorpions.

In 2007, Bergström rode in the Elitserien, the top league in Sweden, at reserve for Västervik and the team finished second in the league. His teammates included Bjarne Pedersen, Tomasz Gollob and Chris Harris with Bergström  recording a 5.45 average. In the Allsvenskan league, the second tier in Sweden, he rode for Vargarna and averaged 7.25. His teammates included Joe Screen, Craig Watson, Leigh Lanham and Kevin Doolan.

Bergström also gained experience with Kolejarz Rawicz in Poland, winning the Polish second division. He also qualified for his fourth Swedish Under-21 individual Final, finishing 10th. He was also placed 10th in the Nordic final and in his last meeting of the season he claimed third place in the Robins individual meeting.

From 2008, Bergström rode for the Scunthorpe Scorpions in Britain and embarked on his third season with the club in 2010. In August 2011 he joined Leicester Lions on loan.

Career details

World championships

 Individual U-21 World Championship
 2007 - 10th place in Qualifying round 2

European championships

 Individual European Championship
 2007 - 10th place in Semi-Final B
 European Pairs Championship
 2007 - 5th place in Semi-Final 1

See also

 Speedway in Sweden
 Sweden national speedway team

References

1986 births
Living people
Swedish speedway riders
Leicester Lions riders
Scunthorpe Scorpions riders